Bourdon German war cemetery is a Second World War German military war grave cemetery, located  northwest of Amiens and close to the village of Bourdon in the Somme department, France.

Gallery

References

External links
 

Cemeteries in Somme (department)
German War Graves Commission
World War II cemeteries in France
World War II memorials in France